Lille Presteskjær Lighthouse is a coastal lighthouse in Rekefjord in the municipality of Sokndal in Rogaland, Norway. The lighthouse is owned by the Norwegian Coastal Administration. It was established in 1895, and was automated and depopulated in 1973.

The original lantern on top of the tower was removed and discarded when the lighthouse was automated in 1973; the present lantern is a replica. The tower is painted red with a white horizontal band.

See also

 List of lighthouses in Norway
 Lighthouses in Norway

References

External links
 Norsk Fyrhistorisk Forening 
 Picture of Lille Presteskjær Lighthouse

Lighthouses completed in 1895
Lighthouses in Rogaland